This page is a list of the Atlanta Falcons NFL Draft selections.  The first draft the Falcons participated in was 1966, in which they made linebacker Tommy Nobis of Texas their first-ever selection.

Key

1966 Draft

1967 Draft

1968 Draft

1969 Draft

1970 Draft

1971 Draft

1972 Draft

1973 Draft

1974 Draft

1975 Draft

1976 Draft

1977 Draft

1978 Draft

1979 Draft

1980 Draft

1981 Draft

1982 Draft

1983 Draft

1984 Draft

1985 Draft

1986 Draft

1987 Draft

1988 Draft

1989 Draft

1990 Draft

1991 Draft

1992 Draft

1993 Draft

1994 Draft

1995 Draft

1996 Draft

1997 Draft

1998 Draft

1999 Draft

2000 Draft

2001 Draft

2002 Draft

2003 Draft

2004 Draft

2005 Draft

2006 Draft

2007 Draft

2008 Draft

2009 Draft

2010 Draft

2011 Draft

2012 Draft

2013 Draft

2014 Draft

2015 Draft

2016 Draft

2017 Draft

2018 Draft

2019 Draft

2020 Draft

2021 Draft

2022 Draft

See also
History of the Atlanta Falcons
List of professional American football drafts

Atlanta Falcons lists
National Football League Draft history by team